Sita Bhawan is a Rana palace in Kathmandu, the capital of Nepal. The palace complex, located East of the Narayanhity Palace, was incorporated in an impressive and vast array of courtyards, gardens and buildings. Sita Bhawan was built by Bhim Shamsher Jang Bahadur Rana in 1929 for his wife Her Highness Sri Teen Sita Bada Maharani Deela Kumari Devi.

History
Sita Bhawan was built by Bhim Shamsher Jang Bahadur Rana in 1928 for his bada Maharani wife, Her Highness Sri Sita Bada Maharani Deela Kumari Devi. She lived in this palace until its nationalisation in 1969.

Current status
Sita Bhawan is largely occupied by, Nepal Children Organization (NCO) and Nepal Academy of Fine Arts (NAFA).

Earthquake of 2015
A large section of this palace was destroyed by 2015 earthquake. Future of this historic building is unknown.

Gallery

See also
Rana palaces of Nepal
Bagh Durbar
Lakshmi Niwas

References

 
Palaces in Kathmandu